Nerf Herder is an American rock band from Santa Barbara, California, formed in 1994 by Parry Gripp (vocals, guitar), Charlie Dennis (bass) and Steve Sherlock (drums). They describe themselves as a "geek rock" band, and are known for simplistic modern punk-style songs with frequently humorous, juvenile, and pop-culture-referencing lyrics.

The band's name is a reference to a line of dialogue between Princess Leia and Han Solo in Star Wars: Episode V – The Empire Strikes Back.

Their 1997 single "Van Halen", a tribute to the band of the same name, received significant radio airplay and led to their first major record deal with Arista Records.  They also composed and performed the theme music to the television series Buffy the Vampire Slayer.

History 

Nerf Herder was formed in Santa Barbara in 1994 by Parry Gripp (vocals, guitar), Charlie Dennis (bass), and Steve Sherlock (drums). Dennis left the band after the release of their debut self-titled album, and was replaced first by Pete Newbury, with Dave Ehrlich also joining as a second guitarist. Newbury's tenure touring with the band was, however, short-lived. He was briefly replaced in 1999 by bassist Marko 72, and then by Justin Fisher, who played bass and keyboards on two albums (How To Meet Girls & American Cheese).

In 1999, Nerf Herder asked Arista to release them from their contract, so they could move forward with a new record, How to Meet Girls, with Honest Don's Records, a subsidiary of Fat Wreck Chords. A special EP for My Records (run by Joey Cape from Lagwagon) entitled My EP was released in 2001, and was followed in 2002 by their album American Cheese.

The band wrote and performed the theme song for the TV series Buffy the Vampire Slayer (1997). In April 2003, Nerf Herder appeared as the musical guest in the final-season Buffy episode "Empty Places" – the very last band to play at The Bronze. Their special connection to the series was further acknowledged by a bit of dialogue, as "Rock City News" played in the background:

Kennedy: What kind of band plays during an apocalypse?
Dawn: I think this band might actually be one of the signs.

By 2003, after the final American Cheese tour dates—during which time Ben Pringle (also of The Rentals during 2005–2008) had replaced Fisher (who had left amicably to front his own band, Psoma)—the band disintegrated. No official split was announced, but a post by Gripp on the band's website some time afterwards detailed how most of the former band members had gone on to get normal jobs. Gripp did some work as a jingle writer, which led to his 2005 solo album For Those About to Shop, We Salute You, a 51-track concept album mimicking various musical styles and focusing on product commercialization.

In late 2006, Nerf Herder made a surprise comeback, announcing on their website that they were playing a handful of gigs with the original lineup of Gripp, Dennis, and Sherlock. For Gripp's May 7, 2007 review of the day, he announced that the original lineup had finally finished recording their 4th album, which did not have a title at that time.  Gripp stated that he wanted the title to be Brownerton, but that idea was shot down. He also stated that of the 13 songs recorded, they would probably pick 10 to be on the album. In June 2007, the band decided on the title Nerf Herder IV, and the album was released through Oglio Records on April 29, 2008.  Pringle returned, and Former Size 14 singer Linus of Hollywood joined the live band (playing guitar and keyboard) in early 2008 for a series of West Coast shows and a short tour of Japan.

In 2014, Nerf Herder began working on album number five, entitled Rockingham, which was released on March 11, 2016.

As of 2019, Nerf Herder has continued to perform live and is currently writing and recording new material.

Band members 

Current members

 Parry Gripp – vocals, guitar (1994–2003, 2005–present)
 Steve Sherlock – drums, vocals (1994–2003, 2005–present)
 Ben Pringle – bass, vocals (2002–2003, 2009–present)
 Linus of Hollywood – guitar, keyboards (2008–present)

Former members

 Charlie Dennis – bass, vocals (1994–1998, 2005–2009)
 Dave Ehrlich – guitar (1997–2003)
 Pete Newbury – bass, vocals (1998–1999)
 Justin Fisher – bass, vocals, keyboards (1999–2002)

Timeline

Discography 

 Studio albums
 Nerf Herder (1996) My Records/Arista Records
 How to Meet Girls (2000) Honest Don's Records
 American Cheese (2002) Honest Don's Records
 IV (2008) Oglio Records
 Rockingham (2016) Golfshirt Records

 Extended plays
 My E.P. (2001) My Records
 High Voltage Christmas Rock (2002) self-released

 Singles

 Compilation album appearances

The following are songs that have been featured on compilations that have not been released on any of the band's albums or EPs

 Happy Meals: A Smorgasbord of My Fav Songs (1996) My Records – "Sorry" (alt version)
 BASEketball soundtrack (1998) Mojo/Universal – "Don't Hate Me (Because I'm Beautiful)"
 Short Music For Short People (1999) Fat Wreck Chords – "Doin' Laundry"
 Metal Rules: Tribute to Bad Hair Days (1999) Priority Records – "Kiss Me Deadly"
 Buffy the Vampire Slayer: The Album (1999) TVT Records – "Buffy the Vampire Slayer Theme"
 Happy Meals Vol. 2 - The Perfect Marriage (2001) My Records – "Hospital"
 Happy Meals Volume 3 (2002) My Records – "Jacket"
 That Darn Punk Original Motion Picture Soundtrack (2002) Kung Fu Records – "Siegfried and Roy"
 Bad Scene, Everyone's Fault: Jawbreaker Tribute (2003) Dying Wish Records – "Chesterfield King"
 Wrecktrospective (2009) Fat Wreck Chords – "5000 Ways to Die" (demo)
 Have a Crappy Summer (2012) Crappy Records – "I'm the Droid You're Looking For"
 Dog Songs (2017) – "Gary and the Princess"

References

External links 

 
 Nerf Herder on Fat Wreck

Alternative rock groups from California
Arista Records artists
Geek rock groups
Musical groups established in 1994
Musical groups disestablished in 2003
Musical groups reestablished in 2006
Punk rock groups from California
1994 establishments in California